The 200 metre freestyle event is an event held at the Summer Olympic Games. The men's event was introduced in 1900, held a second time in 1904 (at 220 yards rather than 200 metres), then was not held again until 1968. When the event returned in 1968, both men's and women's events were held. The event has remained on the programme for every Summer Olympics since.

Medals

Men's medals

Men's multiple medalists

Men's medalists by nation

Women's medals

Women's multiple medalists

Women's medalists by nation

References

Olympic swimming events
200 metre freestyle at the Olympics